Harold Lomas (born 1903; date of death unknown) was an English amateur footballer who played one game in the Football League for Port Vale in August 1924.

Career
Lomas played for Leek and Congleton, before joining Second Division club Port Vale in July 1924. He played as a left-half in a 3–1 defeat to Wolverhampton Wanderers at The Old Recreation Ground on 30 August 1924 and was released without signing as a professional, most probably at the end of the 1924–25 season.

Career statistics
Source:

References

1903 births
Year of death missing
Sportspeople from Leek, Staffordshire
English footballers
Association football defenders
Port Vale F.C. players
English Football League players
Footballers from Staffordshire